Santa Maria a Mare may refer to:
 Abbey of Santa Maria a Mare, Italy
 Church of Our Lady of Sorrows, Pietà, Malta